Cytherean  is an adjective literally meaning of Cythera (Latin Cytherēa, from the Greek adjective Κυθέρεια Kythereia, from Κύθηρα Kythēra 'Cythera'). Cythera is a small Greek island, southeast of the Peloponnesus, and a legendary birthplace of the goddess Aphrodite (Venus). The word Cytherean was first applied to the goddess and later, due to word taboo, to the planet Venus that had been named after the goddess.

When planetary scientists began to have a need to discuss Venus in detail, an adjective was needed. Based on the principles of Latin names in English, the regular adjectival form of the name is Venerean (or Venerian, either pronounced ). However, these forms have an unfortunate similarity to the related word venereal, as in venereal disease (related to "Venerean" as martial is to "Martian"), and is not generally used by astronomers.  The term Venusian is etymologically messy (similar to saying "Earthian" or "Jupiterian"), and a "cleaner" version was desired.

Since Venus has a Greek name, as well as a Roman one, this could be used; however, the adjectival form of Aphrodite, "Aphrodisian" , was felt to be unfortunately similar to "aphrodisiac", again evoking sex rather than astronomy.

A compromise was reached.  In Greek mythology, the goddess Aphrodite was said to have been born from the sea, from which she emerged on a sea shell at the island of Cythera, and as such she was sometimes referred to as Cytherēa. The adjective Cytherean was taken from this name and remained popular in scientific literature for some time. Its perhaps forgotten usage in 18th century erotica did not interfere with this choice.

The term has since fallen out of common use. Venusian  is the form most frequently used, with others, including Venerean appearing from time to time; the term Cytherean is now mostly found in older scientific papers, but some scientists still stick to the "tasteful" naming.  In addition, the word "Cytherean" as an adjective referring to Venus is often found in science fiction of the early and mid 20th century.

See also
List of adjectivals and demonyms of astronomical bodies
Venusians

References

Venus
Planetary science
Greek mythology